Zephyrhills is a brand of spring water sold regionally in the United States by BlueTriton Brands. It is sourced from Crystal Springs, located near Crystal Springs and Zephyrhills, Florida. As well as Cypress Springs, the water is sourced from Blue Springs, White Springs, and Spring of Life in Lake County, Florida. Its headquarters is located in Zephyrhills, Florida.

History 
Zephyrhills Spring Water Company was started in 1957 by Don Robinson; however, the water wasn't bottled under the iconic Zephyrhills Water name until 1964.

Acquisitions 
In the company's history, it has been acquired twice, once in 1987 by Nestlé through the company Perrier and again in 2021 when Nestlé sold the company to a variety of investment firms including One Rock Capital Partners and Metropoulos & Co.

References

External links
Official Site

Bottled water brands
Products introduced in 1964
BlueTriton brands
Companies based in Florida